Sten Hugo Ziegler (born 30 May 1950 in Copenhagen) is a Danish former football player who played for Hvidovre IF in Denmark and Roda JC and Ajax in the Netherlands. He played 25 games and scored one goal for the Danish national team from 1971 to 1981, and represented Denmark at the 1972 Summer Olympics football tournament.

External links
Danish national team profile

1950 births
Living people
Footballers from Copenhagen
Danish men's footballers
Hvidovre IF players
AFC Ajax players
Roda JC Kerkrade players
Eredivisie players
Denmark international footballers
Danish expatriate men's footballers
Danish expatriate sportspeople in the Netherlands
Expatriate footballers in the Netherlands
Footballers at the 1972 Summer Olympics
Olympic footballers of Denmark
Association football midfielders